Spence Nowinsky is an American football coach and former football player. He is currently the defensive coordinator and the defensive line coach at Ohio University.

Playing career
Nowinsky is an alumnus of the Minnesota State where he played college football from 1991 to 1994 as a defensive lineman.

Coaching career
Nowisky's first coaching position was as an assistant at Lake Crystal-Wellcome Memorial High School in Minnesota from 1995 to 1997 He coached Wittenberg-Birnamwood High School in Wisconsin as an assistant from 1997 to 1999.  His first college coaching job was as a Graduate Assistant at Wisconsin from 1999 through 2002.  He spent one season as the defensive line coach for the Idaho Vandals in 2003. He held the same position with his alma mater, Minnesota State, from 2004 to 2006.  He was the assistant head coach at Emporia State from 2007 to 2008.  His first position as a Division 1 defensive coordinator was a Illinois State from 2009 though 2017.

On December 13, 2017, Nowinsky was hired as defensive coordinator and linebackers coach at Miami University.  Miami's defenses were solid during his tenure.  During his first season, Miami finished fourth in scoring defense and fifth in total defense in the MAC.  The following year they were even better finishing second in scoring a third in total defense.  Miami also won the MAC championship that year, and lost in the LendingTree Bowl. In 2020 and 2021 Miami finished third in the MAC in total defense both years.

On January 20, 2022, he accepted the position of defensive coordinator and defensive line coach at Ohio.  In his first season at Ohio he installed a new scheme and the Bobcats struggled to adapt.  Through six games Ohio was surrendering 40.6 points, 561 yards, and 387 passing yards per game but they still were able to get three wins in those games. In the seventh game the defense turned things around giving up only 14 points while forcing 6 turnovers, 5 of which were interceptions, and getting 5 sacks in a win over Western Michigan and continued the sudden turnaround in wins over Northern Illinois, Buffalo, Miami, Ball State, and Bowling Green.  In the final six regular season games Ohio allowed 18.0 points, 321 yards, and 224 passing yards per game and helped Ohio finish MAC conference play on a seven game winning streak to earn the MAC East division title.

Personal life
He and his wife, Jen, have two sons, Tommy and Jack.

References

External links
Ohio Bobcats coaching bio

Living people
1971 births
Ohio Bobcats football coaches
Illinois State Redbirds football coaches
Emporia State Hornets football coaches
Idaho Vandals coaches
Minnesota State Mavericks football coaches
Wisconsin Badgers football coaches
Minnesota State Mavericks football players
Minnesota State University, Mankato alumni